Poostosh is a rural locality (a village) in Cheryomushskoye Rural Settlement of Kotlassky District, Arkhangelsk Oblast, Russia. The population was 2 as of 2010.

Geography 
Pustosh is located 25 km south of Kotlas (the district's administrative centre) by road. Medvedki is the nearest rural locality.

References 

Rural localities in Kotlassky District